In mathematics, the Herbrand–Ribet theorem is a result on the class group of certain number fields. It is a strengthening of Ernst Kummer's theorem to the effect that the prime p divides the class number of the cyclotomic field of p-th roots of unity if and only if p divides the numerator of the n-th Bernoulli number Bn 
for some n, 0 < n < p − 1. The Herbrand–Ribet theorem specifies what, in particular, it means when p divides such an Bn.

Statement 
The Galois group Δ of the cyclotomic field of pth roots of unity for an odd prime p, Q(ζ) with ζp = 1, consists of the p − 1 group elements σa, where . The p part of the class group is a -module (since it is p-primary), hence a module over the group ring . We now define idempotent elements of the group ring for each n from 1 to p − 1, as

It is easy to see that  and  where  is the Kronecker delta. This allows us to break up the p part of the ideal class group G of Q(ζ) by means of the idempotents; if G is the p-primary part of the ideal class group, then, letting Gn = εn(G), we have .

The Herbrand–Ribet theorem states that for odd n, Gn is nontrivial if and only if p divides the Bernoulli number Bp−n. 

The theorem makes no assertion about even values of n, but there is no known p for which Gn is nontrivial for any even n: triviality for all p would be a consequence of Vandiver's conjecture.

Proofs 
The part saying p divides Bp−n if Gn is not trivial is due to Jacques Herbrand. The converse, that if p divides Bp−n then Gn is not trivial is due to Kenneth Ribet, and is considerably more difficult. By class field theory, this can only be true if there is an unramified extension of the field of pth roots of unity by a cyclic extension of degree p which behaves in the specified way under the action of Σ; Ribet proves this by actually constructing such an extension using methods in the theory of modular forms. A more elementary proof of Ribet's converse to Herbrand's theorem, a consequence of the theory of Euler systems, can be found in Washington's book.

Generalizations 
Ribet's methods were developed further by Barry Mazur and Andrew Wiles in order to prove the main conjecture of Iwasawa theory, a corollary of which is a strengthening of the Herbrand–Ribet theorem: the power of p dividing Bp−n is exactly the power of p dividing the order of Gn.

See also
Iwasawa theory

Notes

Cyclotomic fields
Theorems in algebraic number theory